Glutaredoxin 5, also known as GLRX5, is a protein which in humans is encoded by the GLRX5 gene located on chromosome 14. This gene encodes a mitochondrial protein, which is evolutionarily conserved. It is involved in the biogenesis of iron- sulfur clusters, which are required for normal iron homeostasis. Mutations in this gene are associated with autosomal recessive pyridoxine-refractory sideroblastic anemia.

Structure 

The GLRX5 gene contains 2 exons and encodes for a protein that is 13 kDa in size. The protein is highly expressed in erythroid cells. Crystal structure of the GLRX5 protein reveals that the protein likely exists as a tetramer with two Fe-S clusters buried in the interior.

Function 

GLRX5 is a mitochondrial protein is conserved evolutionarily and plays a role in the formation of iron-sulfur clusters, which function to maintain iron homeostasis within the mitochondria and in the cell. GLRX5 is required for the steps in haem synthesis that involves mitochondrial enzymes, and is therefore involved in hematopoiesis. GLRX5 activity is required for normal regulation of hemoglobin synthesis by the iron-sulfur protein ACO1. The function of GLRX5 is highly conserved evolutionarily.

Clinical significance 

Mutations in the GLRX5 gene have been associated with sideroblastic anemia, variant glycine encephalopathy (also known as non-ketotic hyperglycinemia, NKH). as well as pyridoxine-refractory, autosomal recessive anemia (PRARSA). Cells with mutations in GLRX5 activity show deficiency in Fe-S cluster synthesis, which is likely causative of the observed symptoms.

See also 
 glutaredoxin

References

Further reading 

 
 
 

Genes
Human proteins